Angela Featherstone is an actress, writer, director, and advocate for children in foster care. She grew up in the Nova Scotia and Manitoba provinces of Canada.

Career

Modeling 
Within a year of emancipating herself from foster care at age 17, Featherstone became Canada's top model when her September Flare Magazine cover broke all previous records for sales. She quickly expanded upon her success and left for New York, where she signed with the illustrious Click models and later would be one of the first models signed to Next. She would travel the world in the 80s as a top fashion model.

Acting 
For acting, she downplayed her striking features to play unlikely roles, emerging as a versatile actress. She is best known for playing the Maid on Seinfeld, Chloe in Friends, and the fiancé (Linda), who left Adam Sandler's character (Robbie) at the altar in The Wedding Singer. Most recently, she played the role of Maggie on Showtime's Ray Donovan and Jame on Girls for HBO.

Writing 
Featherstone has created sitcoms for Sony, DreamWorks, and NBC television and has written nonfiction for Time, Jane, Flare, Huffington Post, Dame, and Zoomer. Her essay about childhood trauma,God Said No, was published in the 2014 edition of Gargoyle Magazine and nominated for the Pushcart Prize. In 2021  she published the essay 'Forgiveness' in Dame magazine.

An alumnus of UCLA Extension Writer's Program "Personal Essay & Memoir," she is completing her memoir.

Directing 
In 2022, Featherstone began directing with her debut seven-minute film,'L'Étranger.' As a director, she combines her years of experience in fashion as a model; working with important photographers and magazines such as; Italian, French, and American Vogue, Mademoiselle, Seventeen, Sassy, Harpers Bazaar Italia, Grazia, Harpers & Queens, Albert Watson, Bruce Weber, Irving Penn, her love of cinema and decades in the film industry; a refined sense of story as an oft published essayist; her passion for philosophy; and a love of creating safe spaces for collaboration, into a movement of aesthetic bliss.

Curating 
In 2011, she curated Fuck Pretty, a critically acclaimed photography exhibit at the Robert Berman Gallery - featuring emerging female photographers.

Music 
She recorded the song “Coattail Glide” with Raymond Pettibon and the band The Niche Makers in 2011.

Producing 
In 2014, she was an adjunct lecturer at the UCLA Professional Producing Program. In 2022, she produced, 'L'Étranger'.

Advocacy 
Featherstone, a committed advocate for children in foster care, volunteered with the Children's Action Network curating their Heart Gallery from 2011 to 2019 and served on their Winter Wonderland committee in 2014 and 2015. She also mentored a child in foster care through Kidsave from 2011 to 2020.

In 2021, she founded the nonprofit healing school for youth aging out of foster care, Fosteringcare.org. Through this trauma-healing intensive and healing-trade program, she and the founding board members hope to impact the brutal statistics for this extraordinarily vulnerable demographic.

In 2014, she lectured at the ICAN Nexus Conference on Violence Within the Home and its Effects on Children. She continues to lecture and write about healing PTSD, child abuse, human trafficking, and intimacy. Her 2015 essay on child sex trafficking for DAME was picked up by Salon.org and MSN and exposed to over seven million viewers. 2022 marks her 13th year studying moral and spiritual psychology with Rabbi Mordecai Finley, Ph.D. Recently, Featherstone served as a consultant on Cracked Up, a Netflix documentary about the effects and healing of trauma.

Filmography

Movies

Television

References

External links 
 
 Interview with Angela Featherstone

1965 births
Canadian film actresses
Canadian stage actresses
Canadian television actresses
Living people
Actresses from Hamilton, Ontario
20th-century Canadian actresses
21st-century Canadian actresses